The 2005–06 Rochdale A.F.C. season was the club's 85th season in the Football League, and the 32nd consecutive season in the bottom division of the League. Rochdale finished the season in 14th place in League Two.

Statistics 

																												
				
				
				
				
				
				
				
				
				
				
				
				
				
				
				
				
				
				
				
				
				
				
				
				
				
				
				
				
				
				
				
				
|}

League Two

FA Cup

League Cup

League Trophy

References 

Rochdale A.F.C. seasons
Rochdale